Clarksville–Montgomery County Regional Airport  (John F. Outlaw Field), or simply Outlaw Field, is seven miles northwest of Clarksville, in Montgomery County, Tennessee, United States. It is owned by the city of Clarksville and Montgomery County and is near Fort Campbell.

History
It opened in 1937 as a private airport. It was taken over by the United States Army Air Corps during World War II and became known as Clarksville Army Airfield. It was established as a sub-base for the larger Campbell Army Airfield in Fort Campbell, Kentucky, and was activated on 1 June 1942 as a primary basic flying training (level 1) airfield. It conducted flying training until inactivated on 31 October 1945. It remained inactive until transferred to USAF Tactical Air Command on 31 March 1946 and remained under USAF control until 1959 when the Air Force turned over all airport facilities to the United States Army.

In 1960 it returned to public airport status.

Ozark Airlines provided commercial air service to Clarksville from 1955 through 1979. Flights were flown to Nashville and St. Louis, the latter with stops enroute.

Southern Airways briefly served Clarksville in 1962 with flights to Nashville and Memphis, the latter with two stops enroute.

Air Kentucky then served Clarksville from 1980 through 1985. In 1981 Air Kentucky became Allegheny Commuter, a code-share feeder carrier for USAir. Service was provided to Nashville.

Commuter airline Prime Air was the final carrier at Clarksville from 1985 through 1989, initially with flights to Nashville followed by one-stop flights to St. Louis.

Facilities
It has two asphalt runways: 17/35 is 6,000 by 100 feet (1,829 x 30 m) and 5/23 is 4,004 by 100 feet.

For the 12-month period ending December 15, 2009 the airport had 20,600 aircraft operations, average 56 per day: 89% general aviation, 10% military and 1% air taxi. 40 aircraft were then based at the airport: 75% single-engine, 20% multi-engine, 2.5% jet and 2.5% helicopter.

In 2017, a $12.9 million modernization project began.  It included the reconstruction of Runway 17-35 and the parallel taxiway, modernization of the airfield lighting and NAVAIDS, and improvement of drainage features. The modernization project was completed in 2019 and allows for heavier aircraft to utilize the airport.

Future
The terminal was reconstructed in 2011; groundbreaking was on December 17, 2010. The terminal was fully reconstructed by spring 2012.

See also

 Tennessee World War II Army Airfields

References

External links
 

1937 establishments in Tennessee
Airfields of the United States Army Air Forces in Tennessee
Airports in Tennessee
Transportation in Clarksville, Tennessee
Buildings and structures in Montgomery County, Tennessee
USAAF Contract Flying School Airfields
Airports established in 1937
Transportation in Montgomery County, Tennessee